Pitsenbarger may refer to
Ananias Pitsenbarger Farm in Pendleton County, West Virginia, U.S.
John Pitsenbarger, American politician and farmer 
William H. Pitsenbarger (1944–1966), United States Air Force airman
 , container ship named after William H. Pitsenbarger